Pope Urban may refer to one of several popes of the Catholic denomination:

Pope Urban I, pope c. 222–230, a Saint
Pope Urban II, pope 1088–1099, the Blessed Pope Urban
Pope Urban III, pope 1185–1187
Pope Urban IV, pope 1261–1264
Pope Urban V, pope 1362–1370, also the Blessed Pope Urban
Pope Urban VI, pope 1378–1389
Pope Urban VII, pope 1590, had the shortest recognized papal reign
Pope Urban VIII, pope 1623–1644

Urban